Armand Doré (1824–1882) was a French painter. In later years, Doré became an alcoholic, and he died in poverty.

References

External links

1824 births
1882 deaths